Nick Shinton (born 10 May 2001) is a Belgian professional footballer who plays as a goalkeeper for Club NXT.

Club career
Shinton joined the youth academy of Club Brugge in 2016. On 22 August 2020, Shinton made his debut for Brugge's reserve side, Club NXT in the Belgian First Division B against RWDM47. He started as NXT lost 0–2.

Career statistics

Honours
Club Brugge
 Belgian Super Cup: 2021

References

External links
Profile at the Club Brugge website

2001 births
Living people
Belgian footballers
Belgium youth international footballers
Association football goalkeepers
Club NXT players
Club Brugge KV players
Challenger Pro League players